Rebeca Esnaola Bermejo (born 1975) is a Navarrese politician, Minister of Culture and Sports of Navarre since August 2019.

References

1975 births
Government ministers of Navarre
Living people
Politicians from Navarre